Higgins is a suburb in the Belconnen district of Canberra, in the Australian Capital Territory, Australia. The suburb is named after politician and judge Henry Bournes Higgins (1851–1929). It was gazetted on 6 June 1968.  The streets of Higgins are named after judges.

Higgins had two government-run schools, Higgins Primary and Higgins Preschool (both now closed).

Political representation 

For Australian federal elections for the House of Representatives, Higgins is in the Fenner.

For Australian Capital Territory elections for the ACT Legislative Assembly, Higgins is in the Ginninderra electorate.

Geology

Rocks in Higgins are from the Silurian age. Green grey rhyodacite of the Walker Volcanics underlie the south and center of the suburb. North of center is purple and green-grey dacite of the Walker Volcanics that was deposited before the rhyodacite. Purple pink rhyolite is found in the north east. In the north west is purple and green tuff.

References

Suburbs of Canberra